Major-General Alister Grant Dallas  (10 June 1866 – 2 February 1931) was a British Army officer.

Military career
Born the son of Alexander Grant Dallas, JP, DL and Mabel Alice Brooke, Dallas was commissioned into the 16th The Queen's Lancers on 23 August 1886. After serving in the Second Boer War, he became Commandant of the School of Musketry in South Africa in 1907 and then became chief of staff to Sir Henry Rawlinson, commanding IV Corps on the Western Front in late 1914 at the start of the First World War. Rawlinson made staff changes in August 1915 and Dallas became commander of 32nd Brigade in the Gallipoli Campaign. After being evacuated from Gallipoli, Dallas became General Officer Commanding the 53rd (Welsh) Infantry Division in Egypt in January 1916 and saw action with his division at the First and Second Battles of Gaza, in which his division suffered significant losses, in March and April 1917. He handed over command of his division in April 1917.

References

1866 births
1931 deaths
Military personnel from London
British Army major generals
Gallipoli campaign
British Army generals of World War I
Companions of the Order of the Bath
Companions of the Order of St Michael and St George
16th The Queen's Lancers officers
British Army personnel of the Second Boer War